Lemeki Vaipulu (born circa 1961) is a Tongan former rugby union player who played as fly-half. He played for Tonga in the 1987 Rugby World Cup, playing only the match against Canada, in Napier, on 24 May 1987. He is the father of the rugby union flanker Maama Vaipulu.

References

External links

1961 births
Living people
Tongan rugby union players
Rugby union fly-halves
Tonga international rugby union players